Gilbert Glacier is a glacier about 20 nautical miles (37 km) long flowing south from Nichols Snowfield into Mozart Ice Piedmont, situated in northern Alexander Island, Antarctica.

Photographed from the air by Ronne Antarctic Research Expedition (RARE), 1947–48, and mapped from these photographs by D. Searle of Falkland Islands Dependencies Survey (FIDS), 1960.  Named in association with Sullivan Glacier, after Sir William S. Gilbert (1836–1911), the British librettist, by United Kingdom Antarctic Place-Names Committee (UK-APC), 1977.

See also
 List of glaciers in the Antarctic
 Grotto Glacier
 Lennon Glacier
 Yozola Glacier
 Glaciology

Further reading 
 M. Braun, A. Humbert, and A. Moll, Changes of Wilkins Ice Shelf over the past 15 years and inferences on its stability, The Cryosphere, 3, 41–56, 2009 www.the-cryosphere.net/3/41/2009/

References

Glaciers of Alexander Island
W. S. Gilbert